Penukonda revenue division (or Penukonda division) is an administrative division in the Sri Sathya Sai district of the Indian state of Andhra Pradesh. It is one of the 4 revenue divisions in the district with 11 mandals under its administration. The divisional headquarters is located at Penukonda.

Administration 
There are 11 mandals administered under Penukonda revenue division. The mandals or their headquarters are:

See also 
List of revenue divisions in Andhra Pradesh

References 

Revenue divisions in Sri Sathya Sai district